Out Where the Bright Lights Are Glowing is the twelfth studio album by American country music artist Ronnie Milsap, released in 1981 by RCA Records. The album produced one single, "Am I Losing You", which was a #1 hit for Milsap. The album is a tribute to the late Jim Reeves, and all songs are covers of Reeves songs, except for two new tunes, which were written about Reeves specifically for this project. The two new songs are "Out Where the Bright Lights are Glowing" and "Dear Friend".

The album reached #6 on Country charts and reached the Billboard 200, peaking at #89.

Track listing
From the original album sleeve notes.
"Out Where the Bright Lights are Glowing" (Gary Harrison, Kent Robbins) – 3:22 + "String Interlude" – 0.31
"Four Walls" (Marvin Moore, George Campbell) – 3:15
"Pride Goes Before a Fall" (Leon Payne) – 3:03 + "Guitar Interlude" – 0.28
"I'm Beginning to Forget You" (Willie Phelps) – 3:02 + "String Interlude" – 0.23
"He'll Have to Go" (Joe Allison, Audrey Allison) – 2:33
"I'm Gettin' Better" (Jim Reeves) – 4:08
"Am I Losing You" (Reeves) – 3:35 + "String Interlude" – 0.27
"I Won't Forget You" (Harlan Howard) – 2:10 + "Dobro Interlude" – 0:31
"I Guess I'm Crazy (For Loving You)" (Werly Fairburn) – 2:54
"When Two Worlds Collide" (Roger Miller, Bill Anderson) – 2:29 + "String Interlude" – 0:19
"Missing You" (Red Sovine, Dale Noe) – 2:55
"Dear Friend" + Instrumental finale (Dennis Morgan, Kye Fleming) – 3:08

Personnel
From the original album sleeve notes.
Piano: Hargus "Pig" Robbins, Ronnie Milsap
Rhodes Electric Piano: Bobby Emmons, Bobby Ogdin
Synthesizer: Richard Ripani, Ronnie Milsap
Electric Guitar: Billy Sanford, Jimmy Capps
Acoustic Guitar: Jimmy Capps, Jack Watkins
Bass Guitar: Warren Gowers
Harmonica: Charlie McCoy
Vibes: Charlie McCoy, Farrell Morris
Dobro: Hal Rugg
Steel Guitar: Hal Rugg, John Hughey
Drums: Kenny Malone

Production
From the original album sleeve notes.
Strings arranged by D. Bergen White
Strings performed by The Shelly Kurland Strings
Background Vocals: Les Jane Berinati, Jackie Cusic, Gerald Bruce Dees, Dolores Edgin, Sherl Kramer, Donna McElroy, Donna Levine, Ray Walker, Hurshel Wiginton and Duane West
Recorded at Woodland Sound Studio, Nashville, Tennessee
Recording Engineer: Les Ladd
Assistant Engineers: Steve Ham and Russ Martin
Mastering Engineer: Denny Purcell, Woodland Sound Studio
Album photography: Jim McGuire
Album Art Direction: D. Hogan Design

Chart performance

Album

Singles

References

[ Out Where the Bright Lighst Are Glowing], Allmusic.
Ronnie Milsap - Out Where Bright Lights Are Glowing RCA Victor Tracklist, letssingit.com.

1981 albums
Ronnie Milsap albums
RCA Records albums
Albums produced by Tom Collins (record producer)